The Davis Peninsula is an elongated ice-covered peninsula,  wide, between Reid Glacier and Northcliffe Glacier. It was discovered in November 1912 by the Australasian Antarctic Expedition under Mawson, who named it for Captain John King Davis.

References 

Peninsulas of Antarctica
Landforms of Queen Mary Land